Wierd Goedee (born 14 August 1967) is a Dutch basketball coach and former player. He is the current head coach of Apollo Amsterdam, since signing in 2021. He played 33 games for the Netherlands national basketball team.

Playing career
Goedee started his career with BC Eindhoven, which he helped to be promoted to the top level Eredivisie. He then played with Canadians Amsterdam in the 1992–93 season. In 1993, he signed with EBBC Den Bosch, where he stayed for six seasons. The following years he played with Virtus Werkendam and NAC Basketbal. He averaged 10.1 points over his Eredivisie career.

Coaching career
Goedee was the head coach of Eredivisie club BSW Weert.
In 2010, Goedee became the head coach of West-Brabant Giants. He reached the final of the 2010–11 NBB Cup with Giants. The Giants were dissolved after the season due to the bankruptcy of the club.

On 25 June 2021, Goedee signed a 2-year contract to become the new head coach of Apollo Amsterdam.

References

1967 births
Dutch basketball coaches
Apollo Amsterdam coaches
Living people
Dutch men's basketball players
Guards (basketball)